Jim Munro (born 1962 in England) is a British journalist and newspaper website editor. He is currently Executive Sports Editor of The Sun's online edition and writes for the paper.

He is often asked to comment on sport, having appeared as a pundit for television and radio broadcasters including Sky News and BBC Radio Five Live.

News International 

Munro began his career at News International in 1990 as a freelance journalist, splitting his time between the sports desks of The Sun and another of Rupert Murdoch's publications, The Sunday Times.

From March 1993, he worked solely for The Sunday Times, initiating the paper's first Sport On TV column. He also wrote the Sports desk's News Focus column, steering it through its transition to On The Record as well as reporting on football and boxing.

In 1995 he was editor of the paper's Rugby World Cup supplement and after editing the Euro 96 supplement for the tournament in England he was appointed The Sunday Times's first Football Editor.

He held this position from May 1996 to November 2006, during which time he edited several more of the paper's specialist supplements while being responsible for between 13 and 17 pages of The Sunday Times sports section on a weekly basis.

In November 2006 he returned to The Sun as Executive Sports Editor of The Sun Online.

Other work 

For many years Munro wrote a regular column "Speaking Personally"  in the West Ham United match programme and he has also contributed to several official Football Association publications, including England international and FA Cup final match programmes. He has also contributed to many sport magazines.

In March 2009 he was among the nominees for the SJA's Sports Internet Writer of the Year, one of the annual journalism awards judged by sports editors of the UK national press.

Sports Journalists' Association 

Munro was elected  to the committee of the Sports Journalists' Association at the April 2007 AGM. Having served on the committee for four years he stood down in April 2011.

Personal life 

He is married to a journalist from The Sunday Times. They have one son and live in London.

Notes

External links
Official website
Jim Munro video interviews and archive
The Sunday Times newspaper: Jim Munro article search 
Sports Journalists Association of Great Britain website Largest national organisation of its type in the world. Site carries news on sport, journalism and sports journalism

British sports journalists
English sportswriters
British sportswriters
1962 births
Living people
English male non-fiction writers